Cyrus Locher (March 8, 1878August 17, 1929) was a Democratic politician from Ohio. He served in the U.S. Senate.

He graduated from high school at Pandora, Ohio, and from Ohio Wesleyan University in 1903, when he gave the commencement oration. He was later that year named superintendent of schools at Woodsfield, Ohio. He graduated from Western Reserve University Law School.  He also studied briefly at the University of Michigan.

Locher served in various capacities as a prosecutor and public solicitor, as well as law professor in Cleveland, Ohio during the 1910s and 1920s. He was appointed to the U.S. Senate on April 4, 1928 upon the death of Senator Frank B. Willis. Locher served until December 14, 1928, having lost a bid for the nomination in a special election to fill the remainder of Willis's term.

His nephew, Ralph S. Locher, would serve as both the mayor of Cleveland, Ohio from 1962–67, and as an Ohio Supreme Court Justice for two terms between 1977-89.

References 

1878 births
1929 deaths
People from Putnam County, Ohio
Democratic Party United States senators from Ohio
Ohio Democrats
Politicians from Cleveland
Ohio Wesleyan University alumni
Case Western Reserve University School of Law alumni
University of Michigan Law School alumni